Flatt and Scruggs at Carnegie Hall! is a live album by bluegrass artists Flatt and Scruggs. It was recorded on December 8, 1962, at the first bluegrass concert ever performed at Carnegie Hall. It was released in 1963 by Columbia Records (catalog number CL 2045). 

The album debuted on Billboard magazine's Top Country Albums chart on January 25, 1964, peaked at No. 7, and remained on the chart for a total of 16 weeks.

AllMusic gave the album a rating of three stars.

Track listing
Side A
 "Salty Dog Blues" (W. Morris, Z. Morris) [1:57]
 "Durham's Reel" (Stacey, Cirtin, Warren) [1:04]
 "Hot Corn, Cold Corn" (Ackeman, Flatt) [2:21]
 "Footprints In The Snow" (Carter) [2:37]
 "Flint Hill Special" (Scruggs) [2:23]
 "Dig A Hole In The Meadow" (Scruggs, Flatt) [2:00]

Side B
 "I Wonder Where You Are Tonight" (Bond) [1:39]
 "Mama Blues" (Scruggs) [1:25]
 "Take This Hammer" (Ledbetter) [2:06]
 "Fiddle And Banjo" (Stacey, Cirtin, Warren) [1:26]
 "Yonder Stands Little Maggie" (Stacey, Cirtin) [1:48]
 "Let The Church Roll On" (Stacey, Cirtin) [2:01]

Credits
The musicians performing on the album are:
 Lester Flatt - guitar, lead vocals
 Earl Scruggs - banjo, guitar, vocals
 "Cousin Jake" Tullock - bass guitar
 Buck Graves - dobro
 Paul Warren - fiddle
 Billy Powers - guitar

References

1963 albums
Lester Flatt albums
Earl Scruggs albums
Columbia Records albums